Joseph Mande (born March 16, 1983) is an American stand-up comedian, writer, and actor.

Early life
Mande was born in Albuquerque, New Mexico to Louis Mande, a lawyer, and Deborah Mande, a judge. He moved to St. Paul, Minnesota at the age of ten and graduated from Central High School in 2001. He attended Emerson College in Boston where he received a BFA in writing.

Career
In his early career, Joe Mande created the website "Look at this Fucking Hipster" (LATFH.com) in April 2009 as a way to help his dad answer the question, "Is that a hipster?" Within months, with millions of followers and dozens of parodies, it became a cultural phenomenon, referenced in media, newspapers, blogs, and more, and he turned it into a book entitled, Look at This F*cking Hipster.

Mande has appeared on such TV shows as Comedy Central's The Half Hour, VH1's Best Week Ever and Conan.

Mande was a writer for the final three seasons of the NBC sitcom Parks and Recreation, also appearing in seven episodes as Pawnee resident Morris Lerpiss. He has also written for the Comedy Central sketch series Kroll Show, and the Adult Swim series Delocated. He was a producer for the first season of Aziz Ansari's Netflix series Master of None and played Todd in James Franco's film The Disaster Artist. He also wrote for the NBC sitcom The Good Place, created by Parks and Recreation co-creator Mike Schur.

In 2017, Mande released a Netflix comedy special called Joe Mande's Award Winning Comedy Special.

Bitchface
Mande released his first comedy album, Bitchface, on March 14, 2014. The album is in the style of a mixtape with voicemail messages from Fabolous, Roy Hibbert, Jenny Slate, Nick Kroll, Aziz Ansari, The RZA and Amy Poehler.

Personal life
Mande married Kylie Augustine in 2015.

Prior to posting a note on his Twitter account stating that he would no longer use it, Mande was most known for using Twitter to troll famous people and businesses. He claimed to have purchased many of his followers. Mande frequently made tweets about wanting to be La Croix Sparkling Water's spokesperson which led to a cease-and-desist letter from La Croix Sparkling Water. In 2011, he initiated an argument with former NBA player Gilbert Arenas after the latter deleted years worth of allegedly sexist tweets. In 2017, he faced accusations of abusing his platform to promote cyberbullying after tweeting "Barron Trump will be mutilating cats on the white house lawn in like two weeks".

Filmography

References

External links
 Official website
 

1983 births
Living people
Writers from Albuquerque, New Mexico
American male actors
American male comedians
American stand-up comedians
American television writers
American male television writers
Jewish American male actors
Jewish American comedians
Emerson College alumni
Upright Citizens Brigade Theater performers
21st-century American comedians
Screenwriters from New Mexico
21st-century American screenwriters
Jewish American male comedians
21st-century American male writers
21st-century American Jews